Oppsal IF is a multi-sports club from Oslo, Norway. The women's handball team currently competes in Rema 1000-ligaen.

The men's football team currently competes in the 2. divisjon, the third tier of the Norwegian football league system.

Women's handball

Current squad
Squad for the 2021–22 season 

Goalkeeper
 1  Lea Løkke-Owre
 16  Vilde Tornes Finneide
 33  Benedikte Kalstad Hernes 
 99  Julie Næss Brodahl
Wingers
RW
 7  Synne Wikstrøm 
 20  Amalie Hedvig Haug
LW 
 3  Camilla Hennig-Olsen
 11  Nora Løken
 34  Mari Stensrud
Line players
 4  Tiril Spæren
 23  Kristin Halvorsen
 26  Rebecka Hagen

Back players
 5  Mille Tveit Porsmyr
 6  Kaja Kristensen
 9  Kristine Hårtveit Thomassen
 13  Hanna Vesterheim
 14  Henriette Jäck Larsen
 17  Julie Hattestad
 18  Lina Marie Jensen
 19  Lea Janicijevic Malesevic
 22  Birta Run Grétarsdottir 
 31  Marianne Haugsted

2022–2023 Transfers

Joining
  Sofie Løwe (LB) (from  Larvik HK)
  Kristin Loraas Eiriksson (LB) (from  Byåsen HE)
  Mia Kvarme (RB) (from  Haslum HK)
  Henrik Wilhelmsen (coach) (from  Aker Topphåndball)
  Johanna Fossum (GK) (from  Sola HK)
  Vigdis Holmeset (assistant coach) (from  Aker Topphåndball)
  Linn Jørum Sulland (physical trainer)
  Peter Cederholm (physical trainer)

Leaving
  Stian Bjermeland (coach)

Technical staff
 Head coach: Stian Bjermeland
 Assistant coach: Marte Arnesen-Kirkemo

Notable former club and National Team players
  Kari-Anne Henriksen
  Amanda Kurtović (2014–2015)
  Vilde Ingstad (2014–2016)
  Malin Aune (2014–2017)
  Anne Kjersti Suvdal (2014–2017)
  Guro Nestaker (2016–2018)
  Rikke Granlund (2017–2018)

Notable former club players
  Marie Tømmerbakke
  June Bøttger
  Lise Løke
  Nina Stokland
  Alette Stang
  Izabela Duda
  Mari Hegna
  Pernille Huldgaard Christensen
  Marte Jonstad Røkke
  Tina Magnus
  Catharina Fiskerstrand Broch
  Eli Marie Raasok
  Eira Aune
  Thea Imani Sturludóttir
  Lorin Sendi
  Emma Skinnehaugen
  Sofie Fynbo Larsen
  Frida Nåmo Rønning
  Mariann Gabrielsen

Football

The men's association football team currently compete in the 3. divisjon, the fourth tier of the Norwegian football league system, after being relegated from the 2019 2. divisjon.

Recent men's seasons
Sources:
{|class="wikitable"
|-bgcolor="#efefef"
! Season
! 
! Pos.
! Pl.
! W
! D
! L
! GS
! GA
! P
!Cup
!Notes
|-
|2015 
|3. divisjon
|align=right bgcolor=#DDFFDD| 1
|align=right|26||align=right|18||align=right|4||align=right|4
|align=right|74||align=right|28||align=right|58
||First round
|Promoted to 2. divisjon
|-
|2016 
|2. divisjon
|align=right bgcolor="#FFCCCC"| 10
|align=right|26||align=right|8||align=right|5||align=right|13
|align=right|36||align=right|53||align=right|29
||First round
|Relegated to 3. divisjon
|-
|2017 
|3. divisjon
|align=right| 4
|align=right|26||align=right|14||align=right|3||align=right|9
|align=right|58||align=right|49||align=right|45
||First round
|
|-
|2018 
|3. divisjon
|align=right bgcolor=#DDFFDD| 1
|align=right|26||align=right|21||align=right|4||align=right|1
|align=right|85||align=right|17||align=right|67
||First round
|Promoted to 2. divisjon
|-
|2019 
|2. divisjon
|align=right bgcolor="#FFCCCC"| 13
|align=right|26||align=right|6||align=right|6||align=right|14
|align=right|35||align=right|60||align=right|24
||First round
|Relegated to 3. divisjon
|}

References

External links
 Official website
 Official Topphåndball website

 
Norwegian handball clubs
Handball clubs established in 1919
Sport in Oslo
1946 establishments in Norway
Football clubs in Norway
Association football clubs established in 1919
Defunct athletics clubs in Norway
Multi-sport clubs in Norway